Kinnareemimus is a genus of ornithomimosaurian theropod dinosaur from Thailand. It is known only from incomplete remains discovered no later than the early 1990s that includes vertebrae, partial pubic bones, metatarsals, and an incomplete fibula. The third metatarsal exhibits a distinctive lateral "pinching", known as the "arctometarsalian" condition, variations of which are found in ornithomimosaurs, tyrannosauroids, troodontids, and caenagnathids. Its remains were collected from the Early Cretaceous Sao Khua Formation, dating to the Barremian stage, at Phu Wiang, Khon Kaen Province. Its early occurrence makes it among the earliest (if not the earliest) ornithomimosaur known, depending on the age of the formation. Buffetaut et al. suggest the fossils of Kinnareemimus may indicate an Asian origin for advanced ornithomimosaurs.

The genus was first described by Eric Buffetaut, Varavudh Suteethorn and Haiyan Tong in 2009 and the type and only species is Kinnareemimus khonkaenensis. It was named in honor of Kinnaree, "graceful beings of Thai mythology, with the body of a woman and the legs of a bird, said to inhabit the depths of the legendary Himmapan Forest, by allusion to the bird-like feet of this dinosaur". The name "Kinnareemimus" was first mentioned in a 1999 paper by Sasithorn Kamsupha, and (as "Ginnareemimus") in a publication by Ryuichi Kaneko in 2000.

See also 
 Timeline of ornithomimosaur research

References

External links 
 Brief description on the Dinosaur Mailing List

Ornithomimosaurs
Early Cretaceous dinosaurs of Asia
Cretaceous Thailand
Fossils of Thailand
Fossil taxa described in 2009
Taxa named by Éric Buffetaut
Taxa named by Varavudh Suteethorn

Valanginian life
Hauterivian life